The Eternal Idol is the thirteenth studio album by English heavy metal band Black Sabbath, released on 23 November 1987 (UK) and 8 December 1987 (US). It is the first Black Sabbath album to feature vocalist Tony Martin. It spent six weeks on the Billboard 200 chart, peaking at 168. It was also the last full album of new material by Black Sabbath to be released by Warner Bros. Records (in North America), and the final album through their original label Vertigo Records until the release of 13 in 2013.

Background and overview
The album sleeve erroneusly credits Dave Spitz as bass player: the bass was actually played by Bob Daisley. Eric Singer played the drums, with the percussion credit for Bev Bevan being for a few cymbal overdubs on "Scarlet Pimpernel".

The album was originally to be recorded with Spitz and vocalist Ray Gillen. The former was replaced by bassist/lyricist Bob Daisley during initial sessions on Montserrat with producer Jeff Glixman. According to Daisley, Gillen had struggled with the lyrics, and management was not paying him or the rest of the band. Gillen quit shortly after their return to England. Gillen and Eric Singer (who left the band right after he finished his drum parts to join Daisley in Gary Moore's touring band) later joined the band Badlands.

Tony Martin was hired and reconstructed the vocals under the guidance of Chris Tsangarides at Battery Studios shortly before production ended. Most tracks were written by Tony Iommi and Bob Daisley (the vinyl version states that all songs were written by Iommi) although some lyrics were modified by Geoff Nicholls. Martin said he "only sang on, and had no part in writing" The Eternal Idol, but nonetheless "thought [it] was one of the better albums of the band."

The song "Nightmare" was initially written for the 1987 film A Nightmare on Elm Street 3: Dream Warriors.

After Daisley's and Singer's departure, bassist Dave Spitz returned and drummer Bev Bevan was hired for a 1987 tour in support of the album; however, soon Bevan backed out on learning that Sabbath had booked dates in South Africa during the apartheid crisis. 

Bevan was replaced by former Clash drummer Terry Chimes, who appears in the music video for "The Shining". Spitz played bass for a few shows before Jo Burt (formerly of Virginia Wolf) was hired as the new bass player.  The video for "The Shining" was filmed in-between Spitz's departure and Burt's arrival. In 1993, Martin recalled, "The bass player in the 'Shining' video was some guy that we dragged off the street. I can't remember his name but he looked the part. He said that he was a guitarist. I remember he was always talking about how he was a Red Indian, thus all the turquoise he wore! We never saw him again."

Cover art
The album cover features two models in bronze paint re-enacting Auguste Rodin's 1889 sculpture "The Eternal Idol". Due to the paint's toxicity, the models were hospitalized after the shoot. A photograph of the original sculpture was intended as the cover art, but permission could not be secured.

Release and reception

The Eternal Idol was released on 23 November 1987. The album spent six weeks on the Billboard 200 chart, peaking at 168. A three-minute and fifteen second studio outtake titled "Some Kind of Woman", written by Tony Martin shortly after joining the band, appeared as a B-side of "The Shining" single. An early version of "Black Moon"—a song that would ultimately appear on the 1989 album Headless Cross—was released as a B-side of the "Eternal Idol" single.

In 1997, reflecting to Sabbath fanzine Southern Cross, Iommi stated, "I'd like to have seen some of the stuff off The Eternal Idol be a bit more credited, because I think there's some good tracks on that album"; he cited "Ancient Warrior" as one of those tracks.

The album was rereleased on 1 November 2010 in Europe as a two-disc expanded set. Bonus content includes the aforementioned b-sides "Some Kind of Woman" and "Black Moon" on disc 1. Disc 2 contains the session for the album recorded with Ray Gillen on vocals.

Track listing

Standard edition
Music by Tony Iommi; lyrics by Bob Daisley and Geoff Nicholls with contributions from Ray Gillen. "Black Moon" and "Some Kind of Woman" lyrics by Tony Martin and Geoff Nicholls.

2010 deluxe edition Disc 2

Disc 2 of the 2010 deluxe edition consists of the earlier recording sessions, with Ray Gillen on vocals.

Personnel
Black Sabbath
Tony Iommi – guitars
Tony Martin – lead vocals
Ray Gillen – lead vocals (on 2010 deluxe edition Disc 2), sinister laugh on "Nightmare"
Bob Daisley – bass
Geoff Nicholls – keyboards
Eric Singer - drums
Bev Bevan – percussion, cymbal overdubs (on "Scarlet Pimpernel")

Technical personnel
Jeff Glixman – producer, engineer at Associated Independent Recording Studios Monserrat
Vic Coppersmith-Heaven – producer, engineer at Associated Independent Recording Studios London
Chris Tsangarides – producer, engineer and mixing at Battery Studios, London

Release history

Charts

References

External links
 
Eternal Idol at Black Sabbath Online
Sample tracks at Rolling Stone

1987 albums
Black Sabbath albums
Albums produced by Chris Tsangarides
Vertigo Records albums
Warner Records albums
Albums produced by Jeff Glixman
Albums recorded at AIR Studios